Concepción de María is a municipality in the Honduran department of Choluteca

History 
Concepcion de Maria was established in 1852. At the time of the census of 1889, it was listed as a municipality within the Central District.

Demographics 
As of the Census of 2013, there were 26,905 people, 1% of which lived in a different place in the country 5 years ago. The main source of water is the private sector which 27% of habints use. 61% of the people has a basic educational level. The main source of light in houses is with an oil or gas lamp with a 48% using it. Ninety-six percent of the houses use firewood to cook. Three percent of the people has a car of their own. According to Necesidades Básica Insatisfechas 2013 (Unsatisfied Basic Needs) 64% of the population lives in poverty and according with El Instituto de Estadisticas INE 2005 65% live in extreme poverty.

Geography 
The municipality covers an area of 156 km2. The municipality contains 33 villages (aldeas) and 163 hamlets. 

Municipalities of the Choluteca Department